The Walker River Indian Reservation is an Indian reservation located in central Nevada in the United States. It belongs to the Walker River Paiute Tribe, a federally recognized tribe of Northern Paiute people.

The tribe represents two Northern Paiute bands, the larger Aga'idökadö (Agai Ticutta) ("Cutthroat trout Eaters") and the smaller Pakwidökadö (Pugwi Ticutta) ("Chub carp Eaters").

The reservation is located along the Walker River between Yerington and Walker Lake (in Northern Paiute: Hagi). At the current lake level, the reservation has only a small frontage on Walker Lake.  The bulk of the reservation (72.68%) is in Mineral County; with portions in Lyon County (14.37%) and Churchill County (12.95%).

The reservation's land area is 529.970 square miles (1,372.616 km2). In the 2000 census, it had a resident population of 853 persons, and 746 persons in 2010. Schurz is the only town on the reservation. Wovoka, creator of the Ghost Dance important in the 19th century, is buried in Schurz.

Weber Reservoir, an impoundment of the Walker River, is located upstream of Schurz and provides irrigation water for farms on the reservation. Given the environmental conditions, most of the reservation is used for cattle range.

The Walker River Paiute joined with the Pyramid Lake Paiute tribe (two Northern Paiute bands: Kuyuidökadö (Cui Yui Ticutta): "Cui-ui-Fish-Eaters", and Tasiget tuviwarai: "Those who live amidst the mountains") in a 2016 civil rights suit in federal court against the state to secure polling places on their reservations. Otherwise members had to travel excessive miles to reach a polling place. Early voting for the 2016 elections at Walker River reservation started October 22, and during the first two days, turnout nearly equaled the total of all voters in the 2012 presidential election.

Political activism

Native Americans in Nevada have become more politically active in presidential and other elections, as have those in other states. As part of that, they have been seeking more equitable access to polling places and treatment by county and state officials.

Led by chairman Vinton Hawley of the Pyramid Lake Paiute, the Walker River Paiute joined in a successful civil rights suit in federal court against the state government to gain polling places on their homelands in 2016. They have had a discriminatory burden in the past by having to travel excessive distances to vote in elections. Walker River voters were enthusiastic after the victory, with early voting in the first two days on the reservation equal to the total votes cast by members of the tribe in the 2012 presidential election.

Hawley is chairman of the Inter-Tribal Council of Nevada. Many of their members have similar difficulties with access to polling places. On behalf of the council, Hawley has "urged Secretary of State Barbara Cegavske to direct counties to open [homeland] polling places for nine more tribes, including some where ballot boxes are 200-plus miles away, round trip." He also urged the Secretary of State for Nevada to improve conditions at local county polling places for urban Indians, who testified in the suit to being made uncomfortable at most offices.

Notes
Walker River Reservation, Nevada United States Census Bureau

References

External links
 Official Website of the Walker River Paiute Tribe

Northern Paiute
American Indian reservations in Nevada
Federally recognized tribes in the United States
Native American tribes in Nevada
Populated places in Churchill County, Nevada
Populated places in Lyon County, Nevada
Populated places in Mineral County, Nevada